Dorylomorpha is a genus of flies belonging to the family Pipunculidae.

The species of this genus are found in Eurasia and the Americas.

Species
Dorylomorpha abdochaetus Kapoor, Grewal & Sharma, 1987
Dorylomorpha abdoflavus Kapoor, Grewal & Sharma, 1987
Dorylomorpha aberrans Albrecht, 1990
Dorylomorpha aczeli Hardy, 1947
Dorylomorpha alaskensis Albrecht, 1990
Dorylomorpha albitarsis (Zetterstedt, 1844)
Dorylomorpha albrechti Kuznetzov, 1993
Dorylomorpha amurensis Albrecht, 1990
Dorylomorpha anderssoni Albrecht, 1979
Dorylomorpha appendiculata Kapoor, Grewal & Sharma, 1987
Dorylomorpha asiatica Kuznetzov, 1992
Dorylomorpha atramontensis (Banks, 1911)
Dorylomorpha beckeri (Aczél, 1939)
Dorylomorpha borealis (Wahlgren, 1910)
Dorylomorpha burmanica Albrecht, 1990
Dorylomorpha canadensis Hardy, 1943
Dorylomorpha caudelli (Malloch, 1912)
Dorylomorpha clavata Albrecht, 1979
Dorylomorpha clavifemora Coe, 1966
Dorylomorpha clavipes Kuznetzov, 1993
Dorylomorpha confracta Kuznetzov, 1993
Dorylomorpha confusa (Verrall, 1901)
Dorylomorpha dispar Albrecht, 1990
Dorylomorpha exilis (Malloch, 1912)
Dorylomorpha extricata (Collin, 1937)
Dorylomorpha extricatoides Albrecht, 1990
Dorylomorpha fennica Albrecht, 1979
Dorylomorpha flavolateralis Albrecht, 1990
Dorylomorpha flavomaculata (Hough, 1899)
Dorylomorpha flavoscutellaris Albrecht, 1990
Dorylomorpha fulvitarsis Albrecht, 1990
Dorylomorpha hackmani Albrecht, 1979
Dorylomorpha haemorrhoidalis (Zetterstedt, 1838)
Dorylomorpha hardyi Albrecht, 1990
Dorylomorpha hungarica (Aczél, 1939)
Dorylomorpha imparata (Collin, 1937)
Dorylomorpha improvisa Albrecht, 1990
Dorylomorpha incognita (Verrall, 1901)
Dorylomorpha indica Albrecht, 1990
Dorylomorpha infirmata (Collin, 1937)
Dorylomorpha insulana Kuznetzov, 1993
Dorylomorpha kambaitiensis Albrecht, 1990
Dorylomorpha karelica Albrecht, 1979
Dorylomorpha koreana Albrecht, 1990
Dorylomorpha kurodakensis Morakote & Yano, 1990
Dorylomorpha kuznetzovi Kuznetzova, 1992
Dorylomorpha laeta (Becker, 1900)
Dorylomorpha laticlavia Kuznetzov, 1993
Dorylomorpha latifrons Hardy, 1972
Dorylomorpha lautereri Albrecht, 1990
Dorylomorpha lenkoi Hardy, 1965
Dorylomorpha maculata (Walker, 1834)
Dorylomorpha malaisei Albrecht, 1990
Dorylomorpha mongolorum Kuznetzov, 1992
Dorylomorpha montivaga (Hardy, 1943)
Dorylomorpha neglecta Albrecht, 1990
Dorylomorpha occidens (Hardy, 1939)
Dorylomorpha onegensis Albrecht, 1990
Dorylomorpha orientalis Albrecht, 1990
Dorylomorpha platystylis Albrecht, 1979
Dorylomorpha praetermissa Albrecht, 1979
Dorylomorpha rectitermina Morakote & Yano, 1990
Dorylomorpha reveloi Hardy, 1962
Dorylomorpha rufipes (Meigen, 1824)
Dorylomorpha sachalinensis Albrecht, 1990
Dorylomorpha semiclavata Albrecht, 1990
Dorylomorpha shatalkini Albrecht, 1990
Dorylomorpha similis Albrecht, 1990
Dorylomorpha simplex Albrecht, 1990
Dorylomorpha sinensis Xu & Yang, 1991
Dorylomorpha spinosa Albrecht, 1979
Dorylomorpha spinulosa Kuznetzov, 1993
Dorylomorpha stelviana Kehlmaier, 2008
Dorylomorpha stenozona Hardy, 1972
Dorylomorpha subclavata Albrecht, 1990
Dorylomorpha tanasijtshuki Albrecht, 1990
Dorylomorpha translucens (Meijere, 1914)
Dorylomorpha tridentata Hardy, 1943
Dorylomorpha ussuriana Kuznetzov, 1993
Dorylomorpha valida Morakote & Yano, 1990
Dorylomorpha xanthocera (Kowarz, 1887)
Dorylomorpha xanthopus (Thomson, 1870)
Dorylomorpha yamagishii Morakote & Yano, 1990
Dorylomorpha yanoi Morakote & Yano, 1990

References

Pipunculidae
Brachycera genera
Diptera of Europe
Diptera of Asia
Diptera of South America
Diptera of North America